Atreides is Yannis Zouganelis' third studio album. The album contains songs written for the play of the same name which was a "montage of Greek tragedies based on the myth of the House of Atreus". The play included pieces from Oresteia by Aeschylus, Electra by Sophocles, and Iphigenia at Aulis, Iphigenia in Tauris, and Orestes by Euripides translated and adapted from the Ancient Greek by Kostas Myris, who also wrote the lyrics of the songs which were sung by Vasilis Papakonstantinou. The play was performed by "Theatro Erevnas" of Dimitris Potamitis at the Mount Lycabettus theatre in Athens and later broadcast by the Greek national television ERT on 12 November 1979.

Track listing

References

1980 albums
Yannis Zouganelis albums
Adaptations of works by Euripides
Adaptations of works by Sophocles
Works based on Agamemnon (Aeschylus play)
Works based on The Libation Bearers
Works based on The Eumenides